Natural High is a song by the Swedish Power and Heavy metal band HammerFall, released on September 22, 2006. It was the second single released from their album Threshold.

The first single from this album "The Fire Burns Forever" only had one track which bears the same name as the single.Cover artwork made by Samwise Didier and layout by Thomas Everhardt.

Track listing

Personnel
Joacim Cans      - lead & backing vocals
Oscar Dronjak    - lead & rhythm guitars, backing vocals
Stefan Elmgren   - lead & rhythm guitars, backing vocals
Magnus Rosén     - bass guitar
Anders Johansson - drums

Additional personnel
Additional lead vocals on “The Fire Burns Forever” by Robert Kronberg.

Backing vocals by:
Oliver Hartmann
Rolf Köhler
Olaf Zenkbiel
Robert Kronberg
Mats Rendlert
Joacim Lundberg
Markus Sköld
Johan Aremyr

Chart positions

Release information
Formats: cds, Digipack CD-S, 10″ Vinyl
DVDr, Single, Promo with one track on it "Natural High".
10" Vinyl with four tracks: A1 Natural High; A2 Natural High (Karaoke Version); B1 The Fire Burns Forever; B2 Raise The Hammer (live).

External links
Official HammerFall website
Album information

References

1998 singles
HammerFall songs
Songs written by Joacim Cans
Songs written by Oscar Dronjak
2006 singles
2006 songs
Nuclear Blast Records singles